Lorelei King is an American actress, screenwriter and development executive who has been based in the United Kingdom since 1981. She has narrated audiobooks, acted in radio plays for BBC Radio 4 and appeared on television.

Early life 
King spent her childhood moving between Pennsylvania, Arkansas and California. In 1981, she planned to move to either Paris or Yugoslavia, where her family originated, but after a three-day stopover in London, she decided to stay in Britain.

Career 
King has made numerous television roles, which include drama, comedy and children's shows. Her first appearance was in the drama Murrow (1983), a biography of the American news reporter and political commentator Edward R. Murrow and since then she has had roles in many British shows, such as Series 2 on the Sky One show, Mile High as Fresh! airlines HR boss, Stella Lightfoot, Chef! (as Savanna), Linda Milson in ‘’Rumpole of the Bailey’’ in 1991 and in the ITV soap opera Emmerdale as showgirl Vonda Lockhart. As well as this, she has also had parts in films such as Shining Through (1992), Notting Hill (1999), 24 Hours in London (2000) and The House of Mirth (2000), as well lending her voice to radio shows and video games. This includes Dirk Maggs' adaptations of The Adventures of Superman and Batman: Knightfall. She also voiced the character of Mary Osakwe in the UFO: Afterlight computer game. More recently, she provided voices to small parts in the video games Mass Effect: Andromeda (2017), Subnautica (2018) and its sequel Subnautica: Below Zero (2021). In 2006, she appeared in an episode of sitcom Not Going Out as a therapist. She has narrated over 400 audiobooks. King also provided the voice of Samus Aran's Power Suit in a 2005 pinball video game, Metroid Prime Pinball. In 2017 she portrayed the voice of MUTHUR, the eponymous spaceship's computer in Alien: Covenant.

King's work also includes:
 Voicing several female characters (excluding Bella) in Avenger Penguins; Tabs and Marmagora in Fantomcat; and Wendy in the American version of Bob the Builder.
 Providing the UK dubbed voice of the children's interactive video toy TV Teddy.
 Narrating all audiobooks of the Irish children's cartoon series Dinobabies, as well as books by Janet Evanovich, Darynda Jones, Patricia Briggs, Patricia Cornwell, and Debbie Macomber. In addition to numerous Audiofile Earphone and Audie Awards, she was voted Performer of the Year in 1999 and 2001 by the United Kingdom APA and Best Narrator of the Year by Audible.com in 2011.
 Playing all the female roles in Flywheel, Shyster, and Flywheel, that was adapted in the 1990s for BBC Radio 4 from the original Marx Brothers radio series broadcast in the 1930s. Her husband also appeared in the series. 
 Voice directing the CGI animated series Chuggington and several video games such as Gray Matter and Lost Chronicles of Zerzura.
 Writing scripts for Chuggington, Fantomcat, Big Mutha Truckers and Cartoon Network Racing as well rewriting some of the original scripts for Bob the Builder.

Personal life 
King lived in London with her husband, actor Vincent Marzello, until his death on 31 March 2020. She is a British citizen.

Partial filmography
 Murrow (TV – 1986) as Waitress
 Devilman (TV-Mini – 1987) as Dancer/Walla
 Angel Cop (TV-Mini – 1989) as Lucifer
 Shining Through (1992) as Leland's New Secretary
 Thumpkin and the Easter Bunnies (1992)
 Intimate with a Stranger (1995) as Ellen
 Chef! (TV – 1996) as Savanna
 The Saint (1997) as TV Reporter
 Painted Lady (TV-Mini – 1997) as Margot
 Martha, Meet Frank, Daniel and Laurence aka The Very Thought of You (1998) as U.S. Ground Stewardess
 Heart of Darkness (1998) as Mother
 Notting Hill (1999) as Anna's Publicist 
 24 Hours in London (2000) as Lloyd
 The House of Mirth (2000) as Mrs. Hatch
 Surrealismo: The Scandalous Success of Salvador Dali (TV – 2002) as Caresse Crosby
 The Falklands Play (TV – 2002) as Jeane Kirkpatrick
 Bob the Builder: A Christmas to Remember (2001) as Wendy, The Mayor, Mrs. Potts, Doris Ellis and Mrs. Broadbent (US)
 Bob the Builder: The Knights of Fix-A-Lot (2003) as Wendy, Mrs. Potts, Mrs. Bentley, Mrs. Percival, Dorothy, Dr. Florence Mountfitchet and The Librarian (US)
 Second Nature (TV – 2003) as Nancy Reed
 Bob the Builder: LIVE! (2004) as Wendy
 Bob the Builder: Snowed Under: The Bobblesberg Winter Games (2004) Wendy (US)
 Suzie Gold (2004) as Meditation Teacher
 Boo, Zino & the Snurks aka Back to Gaya (2004) as Female Gayan
 Jonathan Creek (S4E4) (2004) as Geraldine Vaccaro
 Bob the Builder: Bob's Big Plan (TV – 2005) as Wendy , Mrs. Potts and The Mayor (US)
 Bob the Builder: When Bob Became a Builder (2006) as Wendy, Mrs. Potts (US)
 Bob the Builder: Built to be Wild (2006) as Wendy (US)
 Manza Latino: Killer on the Loose (2006) as Felipa
 Stan (TV – 2006) as Lucille
 Bob the Builder: Scrambler to the Rescue (2007) as  Wendy, Roley, Mrs. Bentley, Dorothy, Sophia Sabatini, Packer and Vicky Picker (US)
 Bob the Builder: Race to the Finish (2009) as Wendy, Roley, Mrs. Barbara Bentley, Packer & Vicky Picker (US)
 Alien: Covenant (2017) as Voice of Mother
 Avenger Penguins as various characters
 Subnautica as Marguerit Maida / Lifepod 6 Crew (voice only)
 Subnautica: Below Zero as Marguerit Maida
 Mass Effect: Andromeda as Elonis Atandra and Additional Voices

References

External links 
 
 
 Lorelei King radio

Actresses from Pittsburgh
American emigrants to the United Kingdom
American expatriates in England
American voice actresses
American television actresses
American film actresses
American television writers
American women television writers
American women screenwriters
Audiobook narrators
British television actresses
Living people
Naturalised citizens of the United Kingdom
Screenwriters from Pennsylvania
American voice directors
Year of birth missing (living people)